(born February 22, 1964) is a Japanese video game producer and director. Beginning his career in the early 1980s with stints at Universal Technos and Tecmo, Okada went on to become one of the founders of Atlus in 1986, as well as co-creating the Megami Tensei and Persona series of role-playing games. After leaving Atlus in 2003, Okada formed the studio Gaia, which he led until its dissolution in 2010.

Works

References

1964 births
Living people
Businesspeople from Tokyo
Japanese video game directors
Japanese video game producers
Japanese company founders
Megami Tensei
Persona (series)